Myles O'Connor (born April 2, 1967) is a Canadian former professional ice hockey defenceman. O'Connor played in the National Hockey League for the New Jersey Devils and the Mighty Ducks of Anaheim and played 43 regular season games between 1990 and 1994, scoring 3 goals and 4 assists for 7 points, collecting 69 penalty minutes.

Playing career
Born in Calgary, Alberta, O'Connor was drafted 45th overall by the Devils in the 1985 NHL Entry Draft. He played four years for the University of Michigan hockey program before turning pro at the end of the 1988-89 college season. O'Connor spent five years with the Devils organization, splitting time between the AHL and NHL. From 1993 to 1996 O'Connor played 5 games with the Anaheim Ducks and spent the rest of the time playing in the IHL. He spent the 1997-98 season playing in Japan before retiring.

Personal life
His son Logan O'Connor also became a professional hockey player and debuted with the Colorado Avalanche in 2019.

Career statistics

Regular season and playoffs

Awards and honours

References

External links

1967 births
Living people
Canadian ice hockey defencemen
Canadian people of Irish descent
Cincinnati Cyclones (IHL) players
Houston Aeros (1994–2013) players
Michigan Wolverines men's ice hockey players
Mighty Ducks of Anaheim players
New Jersey Devils draft picks
New Jersey Devils players
Nippon Paper Cranes players
Notre Dame Hounds players
San Diego Gulls (IHL) players
Ice hockey people from Calgary
Utica Devils players
AHCA Division I men's ice hockey All-Americans